Grand Ayatollah Mirza Mohsen Koochebaghi Tabrizi (9 January 1924 – 3 August 2011) was an Iranian Twelver Shia Marja.

Early life
Tabrizi was born on 9 January 1924 in Tabriz, Iran. His father, Ayatollah Mirza Abbas Kochebaghi, was also a Grand Ayatollah (Marja'). Tabrizi studied in seminaries in Najaf, Iraq under Grand Ayatollah Abul-Qassim al-Khoei and Mirza Fataah Shahidi Tabrizi.

Social works
He was famous for his religious careers in Tabriz. He was Friday Prayers Imam of Jameh Mosque of Tabriz for years.

Books
Adiye A'mal Haj (1958)
Adiye Namaz Shab (1961)
Makaseb Ayatollah Shahidi (1969)
Basaer Ol-Darajat (1974)
A'mal Haj va Madine (1979)
Shafie Ol-Maznabin (1988)
Ojobat Ol-Astefaat (1995)
Hashiye Bar Orve (2007)
Borhan Alal Vojod Emam Zaman (2010)

Death
He died on 3 August 2011 in his house after a heart attack. His funeral was held on 4 August 2011 and he was buried in Vadi Rahmat of Tabriz.

See also
List of maraji
List of deceased Maraji

Notes

Iranian Islamists
Shia Islamists
1924 births
2011 deaths
People from Tabriz